Parisian stitch is a longer horizontal/vertical stitch used in needlepoint next to a smaller parallel stitch to create a basketweave pattern. The end points on either end alternate in a staggered pattern.

According to Thérèse de Dilmont in the Encyclopedia of Needlework:

The case holding this thread is commonly known as an etu and is derived from the French word meaning fabric case.

Notes

References

The Reader's Digest Association, Complete Guide to Embroidery Stitches, Pleasantville, New York: Marabout, 2004.  

Embroidery stitches